Grant is an unincorporated community and a U.S. Post Office in Park County, Colorado, United States.

Description

It consists largely of a retired general store, post office, and surrounding houses and trailers along the south side of the highway and along the north side of the river. The Grant Post Office has the ZIP Code 80448. Grant is located at the mouth of Geneva Creek where it descends southward from the Front Range. County Road 62 follows the creek northward to Guanella Pass, leading to Georgetown in the canyon of Clear Creek.

Geography

Grant is located at  (39.459788,-105.662556).

Climate
According to the Köppen Climate Classification system, Grant has a warm-summer humid continental climate, abbreviated "Dfb" on climate maps.

See also

References

External links

Unincorporated communities in Park County, Colorado
Unincorporated communities in Colorado